Sukhvinder Singh Sukhu (born 27 March 1964) is an Indian politician currently serving as the Chief Minister of Himachal Pradesh. As a member of Indian National Congress, he is a 4-time and incumbent MLA from Nadaun assembly constituency of Himachal Pradesh.

He was the president of the Himachal Pradesh Congress Committee from 2013 to 2019.

Early life 
Sukhu was born in a Rajput family on 27 March 1964 in Sera village of Nadaun tehsil of Hamirpur district. His father Rashil Singh was a driver in the Himachal Road Transport Corporation, Shimla, whereas his mother Sansar Dei is a homemaker.

Education 
Sukhu is a lawyer by education, having graduated from Himachal Pradesh University. He did his schooling at Government Senior Secondary School, Chhota Shimla followed by graduation from the Center of Excellence, Sanjauli.

Politics 
A native of Hamirpur district, Sukhu started his political career in the Congress' student wing National Students' Union of India, being an activist at the Himachal Pradesh University. He emerged through the ranks and led the NSUI state unit in the late 1980s and mid 1990s (1989-95). Graduating to a full-time political career, he was president of the state Youth Congress in the 2000s (1998-08). He won the municipal election twice in Shimla (1992-02), and was then made secretary of the state unit in 2008, eventually getting to the top of the state unit. He was also chief whip of the Congress Legislature Party (CLP) from 2007 to 2012.

Sukhu is a grassroots politician who has wide organizational experience in the hill state.

Sukhu became the chief minister of Himachal Pradesh after his party's victory in the 2022 Himachal Pradesh Legislative Assembly election. The Congress chose him to become CM and named Mukesh Agnihotri his deputy.

See also
 Sukhu ministry

References

Indian National Congress politicians from Himachal Pradesh
Himachal Pradesh MLAs 2003–2007
Himachal Pradesh MLAs 2007–2012
Himachal Pradesh MLAs 2017–2022
1964 births
Living people
Chief Ministers of Himachal Pradesh
Chief ministers from Indian National Congress